Ioan Soter (16 May 1927 – 26 September 1987) was a Romanian high jumper. He competed in the men's high jump at the 1952 Summer Olympics. He coached Romanian Olympic champion Iolanda Balaș, and married her after her retirement in 1967.

References

1927 births
1987 deaths
Athletes (track and field) at the 1952 Summer Olympics
Romanian male high jumpers
Olympic athletes of Romania
Place of birth missing